Lamourouxia is a genus of flowering plants belonging to the family Orobanchaceae.

Its native range is Mexico to Peru. It is found in the countries of Belize, Colombia, Costa Rica, Ecuador, El Salvador, Guatemala, Honduras, Mexico, Nicaragua, Panamá and Peru. Kew also adds Magadan in Russia, this could be a random mistake.

The genus name of Lamourouxia is in honour of Jean Vincent Félix Lamouroux (1779–1825), a French biologist and naturalist, noted for his seminal work with algae.
It was first described and published in F.W.H.von Humboldt, A.J.A.Bonpland & C.S.Kunth, Nov. Gen. Sp. Vol.2on page 335 in 1818.

Known species
According to Kew:

Lamourouxia barbata 
Lamourouxia brachyantha 
Lamourouxia colimae 
Lamourouxia dasyantha 
Lamourouxia dependens 
Lamourouxia dispar 
Lamourouxia gracilis 
Lamourouxia gutierrezii 
Lamourouxia jaliscana 
Lamourouxia lanceolata 
Lamourouxia longiflora 
Lamourouxia macrantha 
Lamourouxia microphylla 
Lamourouxia multifida 
Lamourouxia nelsonii 
Lamourouxia ovata 
Lamourouxia paneroi 
Lamourouxia parayana 
Lamourouxia pringlei 
Lamourouxia rhinanthifolia 
Lamourouxia smithii 
Lamourouxia sylvatica 
Lamourouxia tenuifolia 
Lamourouxia virgata 
Lamourouxia viscosa 
Lamourouxia xalapensis 
Lamourouxia zimapana

References

Orobanchaceae
Orobanchaceae genera
Plants described in 1818
Flora of Mexico
Flora of Central America
Flora of western South America